Acheng Rangmanpa College, established in 1983, is a general degree college situated at Mahendraganj, in Meghalaya. This college is affiliated with the North Eastern Hill University. This college offers bachelor's degree courses in arts and science.

References

Universities and colleges in Meghalaya
Colleges affiliated to North-Eastern Hill University
Educational institutions established in 1983
1983 establishments in Meghalaya